Image Museum may refer to:

 Image Museum (Portugal) in Braga, Portugal
 Image Museum of Hsinchu City in Hsinchu City, Taiwan